Kristall Elektrostal is an ice hockey team in Elektrostal, Russia. They play in the Junior Hockey League Division B, the second level of Russian junior ice hockey.

History
The club was created as Khimik Elektrostal in 1949. They have changed their name seven times in history:

 1953: Klub imeni Karla Marksa Elektrostal
 1954: DK imeni Karla Marksa Elektrostal
 1956: Elektrostal
 1968: Kristall Elektrostal
 1971: Ledovyi Dvorets Sporta "Kristall"
 2000: Elemach Elektrostal
 2003: Kristall Elektrostal

Notable players
Nikolay Zherdev

Anton Babchuk

Vitali Proshkin

Alexander Suglobov

Alexei Kudashov

Dmitry Shikin

Achievements
Vysshaya Liga champion: 1972.

See also
nKristall Ice Sports Palace

External links
Official site

Ice hockey teams in Russia